Garab (also Romanized as Garāb; also known as Garāb-e ‘Olyā - "Upper Garab") is a city in and capital of Tarhan District, in Kuhdasht County, Lorestan Province, Iran. At the 2006 census, its population was 3,270, in 687 families.

References

Towns and villages in Kuhdasht County
Cities in Lorestan Province